Gotlam is a village and panchayat in Bondapalli mandal, Vizianagaram district of Andhra Pradesh, India.

It is located about 8 km from Vizianagaram city. There is a railway station at Gotlam in Vizianagaram-Raipur main line in East Coast Railway, Indian Railways.

References

Villages in Vizianagaram district